James Calvin "Cal" Cunningham III (born August 6, 1973) is an American lawyer, politician, and retired military officer. A member of the Democratic Party and a lieutenant colonel in the United States Army Reserve, he served one term as a North Carolina state senator from 2001 to 2003. Having previously run for United States Senate in a 2010 primary, Cunningham was the Democratic nominee for the 2020 U.S. Senate election in North Carolina, narrowly losing to incumbent Republican Thom Tillis.

Early life and education
Cunningham was born in Winston-Salem, North Carolina, and grew up in Lexington, North Carolina. He attended Vanderbilt University before transferring to the University of North Carolina at Chapel Hill, graduating in 1996 with a bachelor's degree in political science and philosophy. In the summer of 1993, Cunningham attended American University and interned on Capitol Hill for a subcommittee chaired by Senator Carl Levin.

Cunningham received a Master of Science in public policy and public administration from the London School of Economics and a Juris Doctor from the University of North Carolina School of Law.

Career

U.S. Army Reserve
In 2002, Cunningham was commissioned in the Army Reserve, Judge Advocate General's Corps. He is a graduate of the Officer Basic Course, Airborne School, and the Judge Advocate Officer Advanced Course. Cunningham has served with the XVIII Airborne Corps at Fort Bragg, North Carolina, as a Special Assistant United States Attorney since 2005.

From 2007 to 2008, Cunningham was mobilized as the senior trial counsel for the Multi-National Corps in Iraq. He was lead counsel in the first court-martial since 1968 of a contractor under the Uniform Code of Military Justice.  In 2011 Cunningham was assigned to work with a special operations task force in Afghanistan.

State senate
In November 2000, Cunningham was elected to represent the 23rd Senate district of the North Carolina General Assembly, which included parts of Davidson, Rowan, and Iredell Counties. At the time of his election, he was North Carolina’s youngest legislator. After his election, a defeated opponent challenged Cunningham’s eligibility on the basis that he had moved back to the district a few days too late to meet the requirement of having lived there for a full year, but the courts rejected the challenge. Cunningham declined to run for reelection after his district’s territory was split between three Republican-leaning districts.

Post-senate career 
Cunningham worked at the Wallace & Graham law firm from 2003 until 2004, when he joined Kilpatrick Townsend.

Since 2003, Cunningham has served as an appointee of the Governor on the Board of Trustees of Davidson County Community College. He also served as an appointee of the Governor on the North Carolina Banking Commission. He is a former vice chair of the Governor's Crime Commission.

In 2013, Cunningham joined the environmental services company WasteZero as vice president, government affairs, and general counsel. WasteZero helps support pay-as-you-throw waste reduction systems which municipalities in North Carolina and elsewhere have debated implementing. Cunningham left WasteZero in March 2020, shortly after winning the Democratic nomination, but continues to work for the company as an independent contractor.

U.S. Senate candidacies

2010 primary campaign

In 2010, Cunningham ran for the U.S. Senate seat held by Richard Burr. Retired NATO Supreme Allied Commander General Wesley Clark endorsed Cunningham, saying that he would be "the first veteran of the wars in Iraq and Afghanistan to serve in the U.S. Senate", as did the state's largest organization of teachers, the North Carolina Association of Educators. He finished second in the primary, but since no candidate received 40% of the vote, he advanced to a runoff with the first-place finisher, North Carolina Secretary of State Elaine Marshall, who ultimately won the nomination.

2020 campaign

Cunningham originally declared his candidacy for lieutenant governor of North Carolina, but he withdrew in June 2019 to run for the United States Senate seat held by Thom Tillis instead. During the primary, a Republican-allied Super PAC spent $3 million on ads attacking Cunningham and supporting left-wing state Senator Erica Smith in order to "amplify fault lines in the Democratic party." On March 3, 2020, Cunningham won the Democratic primary with 57% of the vote.

Cunningham stated his support of the Affordable Care Act and called for the expansion of Medicaid in North Carolina, as well as a public health insurance option. He stated his opposition to the Green New Deal and his support for significant investment in green jobs and achieving net zero carbon emissions by 2050.

In July 2020, Tillis claimed Cunningham had been "silent" on the issue of defunding the police, saying, "I assume his silence is consent." Cunningham had published an op-ed a month earlier stating his opposition to defunding the police, instead advocating police reform, including policies that "counsel de-escalation, prohibit chokeholds, limit no-knock warrants, and specifically address the use of deadly force."

Cunningham led incumbent Republican Thom Tillis in the polls for most of the year. In October 2020, Cunningham acknowledged having an extramarital affair. His polling lead shrunk to less than two points prior to election day. Tillis won with 48.7% of the vote to Cunningham's 47%.

Honors and awards
For his service in Iraq, Cunningham was awarded the Bronze Star Medal for meritorious service as a lead investigator examining contractors. In 2009, he received the General Douglas MacArthur Award for Leadership.

Cunningham is a recipient of a Jaycees'  Distinguished Service Award.

In 2007, Cunningham was selected for a Marshall Memorial Fellowship.

Personal life
Cunningham and his wife, Elizabeth, have two children. He is an ordained elder in the Presbyterian Church.

In October 2020, it was reported that Cunningham had exchanged sexually suggestive messages with a married woman who was not his wife. Cunningham confirmed the texts were authentic and apologized for his behavior. The woman confirmed that she had a consensual physical relationship with Cunningham in 2020. The Army Reserve started an investigation into Cunningham.

Electoral history

References

External links

Cunningham Law

 
 

|-

1973 births
21st-century American politicians
Alumni of the London School of Economics
United States Army personnel of the Iraq War
Living people
North Carolina lawyers
Democratic Party North Carolina state senators
People from Lexington, North Carolina
People from Winston-Salem, North Carolina
University of North Carolina at Chapel Hill alumni
University of North Carolina School of Law alumni
Candidates in the 2020 United States Senate elections